"After Loving You" is a song by Elvis Presley, written and composed by Eddie Miller and Johnny Lantz. It was released on his album From Elvis in Memphis and was recorded in American Sound Studio in Memphis on February 18, 1969.

The song was first released by Eddy Arnold (May 1962) and then by Jim Reeves (March 1963). The version in castellan or was performed by Marco T, winning Colombian performer Elvis tribute festival in 1995

External links

1962 songs
Elvis Presley songs
Songs written by Eddie Miller (songwriter)
Song recordings produced by Chips Moman
Song recordings produced by Felton Jarvis